2019 railway strike in Sri Lanka was an industrial dispute which happened for 12 consecutive days between the Sri Lanka Railways and the Government of Sri Lanka over the salary increments. It was considered to be one of the longest railway strikes in Sri Lanka since 2008. The strike began in mid September from midnight and ended up on 7 October 2019.

On 3 October 2019, Sri Lankan government issued an ordinary gazette declaring the railway service as an essential service. It also meant that the leave of government employees were officially cancelled with immediate effect.

On 7 October 2019, the strike action was called off following the discussions with the Minister of Transport and Civil Aviation.

Background 
Sri Lanka Railways is one of the most accessible, cheapest and significant modes of transportation modes in Sri Lanka. However the railway transport in the country has been significantly affected over the years due to the frequent protests held by the labourers of the Railway Department demanding for higher salaries. These issues have often caused severe difficulties for the general public to utilise the railway transport system. Railway transport is the most inefficient transport mode in Sri Lanka as the Sri Lanka Railways often run with severe losses.

Response 
As a remedy to the strike action, about 3000 railway employees who were on strike were suspended. The Sri Lanka Railways was also reported to have lost Rs 15 million in income each day due to the strikes. The rail strikes were highly criticised by the general public who prefer the relevant transport as a main transport mode.

References 

2019 in Sri Lanka
Rail transport strikes
Labour disputes in Sri Lanka